1727 Mette, provisional designation , is a binary Hungaria asteroid and Mars-crosser from the inner regions of the asteroid belt, approximately 9 kilometers in diameter.

It was discovered on 25 January 1965, by English astronomer David Andrews at Boyden Observatory near Bloemfontein in Free State, South Africa . It was named after the discoverer's wife Mette Andrews.

Classification and orbit 

The S-type asteroid is a member of the Hungaria family, which form the innermost dense concentration of asteroids in the Solar System. It is also a Mars-crossing asteroid, a dynamically unstable group between the main belt and the near-Earth populations.

It orbits the Sun in the inner main-belt at a distance of 1.7–2.0 AU once every 2 years and 6 months (922 days). Its orbit has an eccentricity of 0.10 and an inclination of 23° with respect to the ecliptic.

Physical parameters 

A large number of rotational lightcurves of Mette were obtained from photometric observations. They gave a rotation period of approximately 2.981 hours (best rated results) with a brightness variation between 0.22 and 0.38 magnitude, indicating a moderately elongated body. The Collaborative Asteroid Lightcurve Link assumes a standard albedo for stony asteroids of 0.20 and calculates a diameter of 8.97 kilometers, while observations with the Wide-field Infrared Survey Explorer gave a diameter of 5.44 kilometers and an albedo of 0.544.

Naming 

This minor planet was named by the discoverer after his wife, Mette Andrews for her comprehension of his nocturnal working hours and absence from home. The approved naming citation was published by the Minor Planet Center on 1 February 1980.

Moon 

In 2013, a satellite orbiting the asteroid was discovered. The moon measures about 2 kilometers in diameter and orbits Mette once every 20 hours and 59 minutes.

There are several hundreds of asteroids known to have satellites (also see :Category:Binary asteroids).

Notes

References

External links 
 (IAUC) CBET 3402: 20130205 : (1727) METTE
 Lightcurve plot of 1727 Mette, Palmer Divide Observatory, B. D. Warner (2013)
 Asteroid Lightcurve Database (LCDB), query form (info )
 Asteroids with Satellites, Robert Johnston, johnstonsarchive.net
 Dictionary of Minor Planet Names, Google books
 Asteroids and comets rotation curves, CdR – Observatoire de Genève, Raoul Behrend
 Discovery Circumstances: Numbered Minor Planets (1)-(5000) – Minor Planet Center
 
 

001727
001727
Discoveries by A. David Andrews
Named minor planets
001727
001727
19650125
20130117